In the context of written composition, drafting refers to any process of generating preliminary versions of a written work. Drafting happens at any stage of the writing process as writers generate trial versions of the text they're developing.  At the phrasal level, these versions may last less than a second, as writers compose and then delete trial sentences; as fully developed attempts that have reached the end of a stage of usefulness, draft documents may last for perpetuity as saved "versions" or as paper files in archives.
Even though it happens at any stage of the writing process it makes a tremendous difference in the way one writes. Writers may get lazy to draft documents and have to keep re-writing, but at the end of the day, it makes a difference since it shows an area of improvement. Writing a paper won't come out perfect the first time, there always needs to be revisions done to fully be prepared when going through the writing process.

Process of Development
The process of drafting development usually starts from a young age. At the start when students are taught how to write an essay in classrooms, they are taught the writing steps. It may go with an introduction paragraph, a body paragraph, and a conclusion paragraph. Before a student is guided to start with any of these the drafting process is introduced. Students are taught to write notes before digging into the whole subject itself. For most young students it becomes a habit for most students to use it every single time they write.

Changes in Drafts
The process of drafting development usually starts from a young age. At the start when students are taught how to write an essay in classrooms, they are taught the writing steps. It may go with an introduction paragraph, a body paragraph, and a conclusion paragraph. Before a student is guided to start with any of these the drafting process is introduced. Students are taught to write notes before digging into the whole subject itself. For most young students it becomes a habit for most students to use it every single time they write.

Changes of Drafts
Many writers may see or not see the change that draft writing takes place. The writing process consists of a lot of techniques, but students are taught to first start with a draft, then follow along with their final draft. The big concept of the writing process is not taken into consideration once writers develop more techniques. The structure when writing an essay and making changes to the whole thing is drafting. Drafting consists of writing multiple papers, with corrections to better your writing and mistakes from the previous piece.
Young students are taught this way, according to much research because it helps students make it easier for them to write something. It helps them build up skills to grow into developing more skills. Skills take time to grow, if students start at a young age it can make them a strong writers once their education levels are higher.
In a book that became popular in the 1950s, The Elements of Style, Strunk and White characterize a first draft as a less-edited version of the final draft with the purpose of "foresee[ing]...the shape of what is to come and pursue that shape". In Writing Without Teachers, a more recent take on the role of draft documents, Peter Elbow characterizes a draft less as a first attempt at a predetermined final point and more as an attempt at exploring and where a final version might end up.  As he puts it, “[w]riting is a way to end up thinking something you couldn’t have started out thinking.” According to Elbow, the best way to accomplish this is a series of drafts which come together to produce an emerging “center of gravity” that then translates into the main focus on the work—a holistic process, in other words, rather than the linear process envisioned by Strunk and White and early writing process theory.  Elbow reasoned that if a writer "learns to maximize the interaction" among their "ideas or points of view, [they] can produce new ones that didn’t seem available."

Empirical studies of writers at work indicate that writers can be doing any or all of the following during phases of drafting:
 developing cohesion 
 organizing their thinking in relation to text produced so far
 experimenting with phrasing
 explaining or linking examples/ideas
 generating transitions
 discovering a central argument/point
 elaborating on key ideas
pausing to make adjustments to spelling, word-choice, and syntax
In a source, The English Journal 97.5  it showed how one's writing steps could be each other's own writing experiences. We are all right differently in our own style, where one way may work better than the other, but it all comes down to one's personal preference. Students have to take one step at a time when completing a writing piece or even starting the draft writing piece. In general everyone has their own opinion because one thing will not work for everyone else

Below are techniques that may work for students:
Breaking down the pieces
Not draft writing
Starting it weeks prior to the due date
Writing at night or early morning

How One Could Start Their Own Draft
Writer's block could occur when one may not know how to continue writing or how to continue in the writing process itself. First you can start with writing down notes, then start with a brief outline of what you may want to include. As soon as you start this you can begin writing your paper, you can then later revise it as a draft. Your first draft isn't supposed to be perfect, you're supposed to be able to progress your writing with revisions from your draft.
In an article by Burtis P.J. There is research being done that connects within the whole process of draft writing. It explores the way that we may even use different types of genres when we write. The development of writing gets split up into different parts. At times when we write for an English course we may write in a specific way, but if we may be writing for a film class another technique may be used. The article expresses how when we write it is generally specifically to the topic that we are focusing on. Generally we might not notice the effects it has, but once you're able to explore in drafts it helps broaden incentives into the way one writes.

Techniques that help with Drafting

How can you draft?
-Write down anything that comes to your mind before writing
-Write multiple drafts
-Write out a paper and revise it
-Hand write it or on a google doc 
-Mark it with comments and suggestions
-When having a paper written ask someone to peer review it

How May Draft Writing Help?
Draft writing could help in a lot of incentives, more importantly it specifically helps in making a writer strengthen different points. At times we often struggle with the way we may edit our papers. After re reading it we see common mistakes that could have been easily corrected. When draft writing you are able to see the extensive ways one could improve and how far the improvement has gone. Next time you are writing , compare your first draft to your final draft. In doing this you could see the areas of improvement and how the techniques of a writer could change a lot.

Styles of writing

See also
Draft (music)
Foul papers
Manuscript format
Rough ASCII
Sketch (drawing), a similar concept, but for visual arts

References

Composition (language)
Textual scholarship
Publishing